The West Indies women's cricket team represents the West Indies in international women's cricket. The team is governed by Cricket West Indies. They first competed in international cricket in 1976, when they played against Australia in two Test matches. 

They recorded their first, and only, Test match victory against India in 1976, as part of a six Test match series. They have played 12 Test matches in their history, against four different opponents, most recently in 2004 against Pakistan.

The West Indies played their first One Day International in 1979, against England. They competed in their first Women's Cricket World Cup in 1993, and reached the final of the tournament in 2013. Overall, they have played 187 ODIs, winning 83 and losing 97.

The side played their first Twenty20 International in 2008, against Ireland. They have appeared at every edition of the ICC Women's T20 World Cup, with the first taking place in 2009. The West Indies won the tournament in 2016, beating Australia in the final. Overall, they have played 141 T20Is, winning 74 and losing 59.

Key

Test cricket

One Day International

Twenty20 International

References

Cricket records and statistics
record by opponent